Parliamentary elections were held in Hungary on 8 May 1994, with a second round of voting in 174 of the 176 single member constituencies on 29 May. They resulted in the return to power of the Hungarian Socialist Party, the former Communist party, under the leadership of Gyula Horn, who became Prime Minister. The Socialists achieved a remarkable revival, winning an overall majority of 209 seats out of 386, up from 33 in 1990.

The governing Hungarian Democratic Forum was severely defeated, falling from 165 seats to 38 for third place. It was also a disappointment for the principal opposition party of the previous parliament, the Alliance of Free Democrats, which failed to capitalize on the government's unpopularity and lost seats. Poor economic performance, apparent government incompetence and a certain nostalgia for the social security of the communist era appear to be the main reasons for the result, together with significant reform of the Socialists' policies, with commitment to the expansion for the market economy and continued compensation for the victims of communism.

While the Socialists had enough seats to govern alone, Horn decided to form a coalition with the Free Democrats, giving him a two-thirds majority.  This was partly to assuage public concerns inside and outside Hungary over an ex-Communist party with an absolute majority, and partly to get his reform package past his own party's left wing.

Results

Notes

References

Elections in Hungary
Hungary
Parliamentary